Lillian Trimble Bradley (1875 – 1959) was an American theatrical director and playwright, considered the first female director on Broadway. After attending schools in Paris in her youth, Bradley went to study at the Moscow Art Theatre, where she directed four student productions for Constantin Stanislavski's group. By the time she finished her studies she had written two plays and had ambitions to move back to the United States to become a stage director. Once there, Bradley met producer George Broadhurst and her career launched. Her career went on for forty-one years as she directed numerous productions. Critics both applauded and were threatened by a female presence in the directing world.

Early life 
Lillian Trimble Bradley was born in Milton, Kentucky, in 1875. Her family was always on the move, so from a young age, Bradley set about to design her own education. She was educated in a convent school in Paris, where she attended the theatre regularly and applied as an apprentice to Andre Antoine. She then assisted with two of Antoine’s productions.

Following her education in Paris, Bradley went to Moscow for two years to study at the Moscow Art Theatre. There she directed four student productions for Stanislavski’s group and learned as much about technical theatre as she could. By the time her studies at the Moscow Art Theatre ended, she had written two plays, and she returned to the United States with ambitions to become a stage director.

Once back in the United States, Bradley married a wealthy stock broker named D. I. Bradley. He was sixty-five years old while Bradley was twenty-eight. After his death, Bradley acquired all of his land and money that she used to obtain a large house in which she built a laboratory for lighting and set design experimentations.

Career

The Broadhurst Theatre 
Bradley’s career was able to find traction when Bradley became associated with producer George Broadhurst in 1918. Before Bradley met George Broadhurst, managers refused to believe that a woman could master the infinite technical detail which goes with the production of even the simplest play. Broadhurst expressed interest in producing Bradley’s play, The Woman on the Index, and Bradley agreed under the condition that she would assist with the direction. Later that same year, Broadhurst appointed Bradley as the general stage director of the Broadhurst Theatre. It was this appointment which earned Bradley the title of “first American woman director”. Bradley continued to direct under Broadhurst’s management until 1924. During her time at the Broadhurst Theatre, Bradley directed a total of eight Broadway productions including The Wonderful Things (1920), Come Seven (1920), Tarzan of the Apes (1921), and Izzy (1924). She married Broadhurst in 1925 and appears to have retired and moved to Santa Barbara where Broadhurst died in 1952 and Bradley died in 1959.

The Crimson Alibi 
The production of The Crimson Alibi established Bradley as a director. A New York Times review praised the production, saying “the production of plays and its infinite detail – the working out of the lighting, etc. – have been regarded as man’s work, and Mrs. Bradley is probably the first woman in the country to go into it as a profession. There are, of course, several women playwrights, such as Rachel Crothers, who direct their own plays, but they are playwrights primarily, and directors secondarily. Mrs. Bradley, although she has written plays, did so only as a means to an end – and that end was directing.” The same article referred to Lillian Trimble Bradley as “the five-foot pocket edition of a woman Belasco.”  This also refers to Edith Ellis, who directed The Return of Eve in 1908, but, based on reviews, Bradley was seen as the first woman director because she was able to project her identity in her own productions. While some critics viewed Bradley’s direction as similar to a man’s, others marked the work as specifically feminine.

Directing melodrama 
Melodrama was one of the most popular genres of performance at the time, and much of Bradley’s work fell into this genre. “Bradley believe[s] in melodrama as the most effective stage presentation of the period as it has been at all times.” Bradley wrote and directed plays that starred women yet relied on the melodramatic trope of a woman getting and keeping a man’s attention. Bradley’s debut production The Woman on the Index, is a melodrama which goes against gender expectations by having the man in the passive role and portrayed the women as the instigators of action, but the play still left both its female leads clamoring for the role of the “good wife” as their goal. It was not her work on stage but rather her work behind the scenes that was challenging to gender expectations of the time. When asked what she thought of stage directing as a profession for women, Mrs. Bradley laughed and said “Frankly, I can not honestly recommend it, though personally I love my work. Stage directing means very hard work, meals at odd times, loss of sleep, and no leisure”

References

External links

1875 births
1959 deaths
Women theatre directors
People from Trimble County, Kentucky